Conor Morrison (born 24 February 1989 in Herisau, Switzerland) is a professional ice hockey player currently playing for the Augsburger Panther in the Deutsche Eishockey Liga (DEL).

His father is Dave Morrison, a retired professional ice hockey player who is currently the Director of Amateur Scouting for the Toronto Maple Leafs. His grandfather is Jim Morrison, a retired former professional ice hockey defenceman, coach and scout.

References

External links

1989 births
Living people
People from Appenzell Ausserrhoden
Augsburger Panther players
Salmon Arm Silverbacks players
Harvard Crimson men's ice hockey players
Swiss ice hockey left wingers